The 1931 Vermont Catamounts football team was an American football team that represented  the University of Vermont as an independent during the 1931 college football season. In their second year under head coach David L. Dunn, the team compiled a 1–8 record. Coach Dunn resigned as head coach at the conclusion of the season.

Schedule

References

Vermont
Vermont Catamounts football seasons
Vermont Catamounts football